Leroy "Bamm Bamm" Kaestner (born September 28, 1988) is a Dutch welterweight kickboxer fighting out of Bullys gym Arnhem for Team Aerts/Afafa.  He is the K-1 World MAX 2009 Europe Tournament champion currently competing in K-1 MAX.

Career and biography 
Kaestner idolized Peter Aerts and began training in kickboxing at the age of 10. After five years of fighting at smaller Dutch events, Leroy Kaestner made his K-1 debut at the K-1 World MAX 2009 Europe Tournament in Utrecht, Netherlands on March 1, 2009, becoming the surprise winner of the competition, beating Marco Pique in the final by unanimous decision.  As a result of his victory Kaestner would qualify for the K-1 World MAX 2009 Final 16, losing by decision to eventual runner up Andy Souwer.  Kaestner's performance against Souwer would lead to him being invited to the K-1 World MAX 2009 Final 8 as a reservist, although he would lose his bout to local fighter Yasuhiro Kido.

Since that tournament Leroy has continued his progress claiming a notable win over K-1 MAX finalist Gago Drago at It's Showtime 2010 Amsterdam.  Despite this recent run of good form Kaestner was not re-invited back to the K-1 Max final in 2010.  At the end of 2010, Kaestner won his second major title by defeating Cagri Ermis to win the W.F.C.A. European title -72.5 kg.

Titles 
2010 WFCA European Welterweight ( – 72.5 kg) champion
2009 WFCA Muay Thai European Junior Middleweight (-69.85) champion
2009 K-1 World MAX Europe Tournament champion
2014 World champion middleweight k-1.. win 90.000 dollar

Kickboxing record 

|-
|- bgcolor="#CCFFCC"
| 2011-03-27 || Win ||align=left| Marvin Sansaar || Battle in the Bhoele, Sporthal de Boeler || Eerbeek, Netherlands || KO || 1 || || 33-6-2
|- bgcolor="#CCFFCC"
| 2011-03-06 || Win ||align=left| Ramzi Tamaditi || It's Showtime Sporthallen Zuid || Amsterdam, Netherlands || Decision (Split) || 3 || 3:00 || 32-6-2 
|-  bgcolor="#FFBBBB"
| 2010-12-04 || Loss ||align=left| Armen Petrosyan || Janus Fight Night 2010 || Padova, Italy || Decision (Unanimous) || 3 || 3:00 || 31-6-2
|-
|-  bgcolor="#CCFFCC"
| 2010-11-24 || Win ||align=left| Cagri Ermis || Thailand vs Challenger series "Thailand vs Germany" || Ulm, Germany || Decision (Unanimous) || 5 || 3:00 || 31-5-2
|-
! style=background:white colspan=9 |
|-
|-  bgcolor="#CCFFCC"
| 2010-10-09 || Win ||align=left| Hakim Ait Hma || Ring Rage Part 5 || Assen, Netherlands || Decision || 3 || 3:00 || 30-5-1
|-  bgcolor="#CCFFCC"
| 2010-05-29 || Win ||align=left| Gago Drago || It's Showtime 2010 Amsterdam || Amsterdam, Netherlands || Decision (4-1) || 3 || 3:00 || 29-5-2
|-
|-  bgcolor="#CCFFCC"
| 2010-03-21 || Win ||align=left| Menno Dijkstra || K-1 World MAX 2010 West Europe, Super Fight || Utrecht, Netherlands || Decision (Unanimous) || 3 || 3:00 || 28-5-2
|-
|-  bgcolor="#FFBBBB"
| 2010-01-30 || Loss ||align=left| Nieky Holzken || Beast of the East || Zutphen, Netherlands || Decision (Unanimous) || 3 || 3:00 || 27-5-2
|-
|-  bgcolor=#c5d2ea
| 2009-11-08 || Draw ||align=left| Faldir Chahbari || Heroes Fight Event || Apeldoorn, Netherlands || Decision Draw || 3 || 3:00 || 27-4-2
|-
|-  bgcolor="#CCFFCC"
| 2009-09-27 || Win ||align=left| Otmar Diagne || Knock Out Combat 6 || Eindhoven, Netherlands || Decision (Unanimous) || 3 || 3:00 || 27-4-1
|-
! style=background:white colspan=9 |
|-
|-  bgcolor="#CCFFCC"
| 2009-08-08 || Win||align=left| Andy Ristie || Slamm!! Soema Na Basi IV || Paramaribo, Suriname ||Decision (unanimous) || 3 || 3:00 || 26-4-1
|-
|-  bgcolor="#FFBBBB"
| 2009-07-13 || Loss ||align=left| Yasuhiro Kido || K-1 World MAX 2009 Final 8, Reserve Fight || Tokyo, Japan || Decision (Unanimous) || 3 || 3:00 || 25-4-1
|-
|-  bgcolor="#FFBBBB"
| 2009-04-21 || Loss ||align=left| Andy Souwer || K-1 World MAX 2009 Final 16 || Fukuoka, Japan || Decision (Unanimous) || 3 || 3:00 || 25-3-1
|-
! style=background:white colspan=9 |
|-
|-  bgcolor="#CCFFCC"
| 2009-03-01 || Win ||align=left| Marco Pique || K-1 World MAX 2009 Europe, Final || Utrecht, Netherlands || Decision (Unanimous) || 3 || 3:00 || 25-2-1
|-
! style=background:white colspan=9 |
|-
|-  bgcolor="#CCFFCC"
| 2009-03-01 || Win ||align=left| Mohammed Rahhoui || K-1 World MAX 2009 Europe, Semi Finals || Utrecht, Netherlands || Decision (Unanimous) || 3 || 3:00 || 24-2-1
|-
|-  bgcolor="#CCFFCC"
| 2009-03-01 || Win ||align=left| Ali Gunyar || K-1 World MAX 2009 Europe, Quarter Finals || Utrecht, Netherlands || Decision (Unanimous) || 3 || 3:00 || 23-2-1
|-  bgcolor="#FFBBBB"
| 2008-11-23 || Loss ||align=left| Mohammed el Atmani || Victory or Hell Gala || Netherlands || Decision (Unanimous) || 5 || 3:00 || 22-2-1
|-  bgcolor="#CCFFCC"
| 2008-09-21 || Win ||align=left| Marvin Sansaar || SLAMM Events presents "Back to the Old School" || Amsterdam, Netherlands || Decision (Unanimous)  || 5 || 3:00 || 22-1-1
|-  bgcolor="#FFBBBB"
| 2008-05-25 || Loss ||align=left| Marat Grigorian || Muay Thai Gala || Hoofddorp, Netherlands || TKO (Doctor stoppage) ||  ||  || 21-1-1
|-  bgcolor="#CCFFCC"
| 2008-02-23 || Win ||align=left| Ilias Ghazouat || Gala in Nieuwegein || Nieuwegein, Netherlands || Decision (Unanimous)  || 5 || 2:00 || 21-0-1
|-  bgcolor="#c5d2ea"
| 2008-02-17 || Draw ||align=left| Robin van Roosmalen || K-1 MAX Netherlands 2008, Opening Fight || Utrecht, Netherlands || Decision Draw || 3 || 3:00 || 21-0-1
|-  bgcolor="#CCFFCC"
| 2007-10-21 || Win ||align=left| Hammadi el Mahdaoui || TT Beverwijk Gala || Beverwijk, Netherlands || Decision || 4 || 2:00 || 20-0
|-  bgcolor="#CCFFCC"
| 2007-09-01 || Win ||align=left| Sergio Menig || Kumiteé Everybody Gym || Hilversum, Netherlands || KO || 2 || || 19-0
|-  bgcolor="#CCFFCC"
| 2007-06-16 || Win ||align=left| Omayev Shamil || Fight Night Purmerend || Purmerend, Netherlands || TKO  || 4 || || 18-0
|-  bgcolor="#CCFFCC"
| 2007-05-12 || Win ||align=left| Şamil Ünal || Kumiteé Everybody Gym || Hilversum, Netherlands || Decision (Unanimous) || 5 || 2:00 || 17-0
|-  bgcolor="#CCFFCC"
| 2007-04-15 || Win ||align=left| Nourdin Kassrioui || Champions of the Future || Hoofddorp, Netherlands || Decision (Unanimous) || 5 || 3:00 || 16-0
|-  bgcolor="#CCFFCC"
| 2007-03-03 || Win ||align=left| Sahand Dorff || Fight Night Amsterdam, Zonnehuis || Amsterdam, Netherlands || TKO (Corner stoppage) || || || 15-0
|-  bgcolor="#CCFFCC"
| 2007-02-03 || Win ||align=left| Farid Riffi || Battle of Flevoland ||  Netherlands || Decision (Unanimous) || 5 || 2:00 || 14-0
|-  bgcolor="#CCFFCC"
| 2006-10-29 || Win ||align=left| Bilal Siali|| Champions of the Future || Hoofddorp, Netherlands || TKO (Ref stop./gave up) || 3 ||  || 13-0
|-  bgcolor="#CCFFCC"
| 2006-10-01 || Win ||align=left| Murthel Groenhart || SLAMM "Nederland vs Thailand II" || Almere, Netherlands || Decision (Unanimous) || 5 || 2:00 || 12-0
|-  bgcolor="#CCFFCC"
| 2006-05-06 || Win ||align=left| Ilias Zbairi || WFCA Muay Thai Gala Katwijk || Katwijk, Netherlands || Decision (Unanimous) || 3 || 2:00 || 11-0
|-  bgcolor="#CCFFCC"
| 2006-02-12 || Win ||align=left| Dams Morach || Gala in Zilvermeeuwen || Amsterdam, Netherlands || Decision || 3 || 2:00 || 10-0
|-  bgcolor="#CCFFCC"
| 2006-01-28 || Win ||align=left| Nick Beljaards || Fight Club, Wellness Profi Center || Purmerend, Netherlands || Decision (Unanimous) || 3 || 2:00 || 9-0
|-  bgcolor="#CCFFCC"
| 2005-12-10 || Win ||align=left| Bilal Fiomar || Muay Thai gala Katwijk || Katwijk, Netherlands || Decision (Unanimous) || 3 || 2:00 || 8-0
|-  bgcolor="#CCFFCC"
| 2005-11-26 || Win ||align=left| Fernando Groenhart || Muay Thai gala Hoogwoud || Hoogwoud, Netherlands || Decision (Unanimous) || 3 || 2:00 || 7-0
|-  bgcolor="#CCFFCC"
| 2005-10-01 || Win ||align=left| Anthony Kane || Fightsport gala "Avondje Oost" || Hilversum, Netherlands  || Decision (Unanimous) || 3 || 2:00 || 6-0
|-  bgcolor="#CCFFCC"
| 2005-09-18 || Win ||align=left| Tanit Im On || Gala in Zilvermeeuwen || Zaandam, Netherlands || Decision || 3 || 2:00 || 5-0
|-  bgcolor="#CCFFCC"
| 2005-05-21 || Win ||align=left| Mohamed el Bouddounti || Muay Thai gala Purmerend || Purmerend, Netherlands || KO  || 2 || || 4-0
|-  bgcolor="#CCFFCC"
| 2005-04-24 || Win ||align=left| Evert Wolff || Nederland vs Russia, Jaap Edenhal || Amsterdam, Netherlands || TKO  || 1 || || 3-0
|-  bgcolor="#CCFFCC"
| 2005-02-12 || Win ||align=left| Youssef Srour || Gala in Badhoevedorp || Badhoevedorp, Netherlands || TKO (Referee stoppage) || 2 || 1:01 || 2-0
|-  bgcolor="#CCFFCC"
| 2004-09-18 || Win ||align=left| Kurt Gökhan || Gala in Zilvermeeuwen || Amsterdam, Netherlands || TKO  || 1 || || 1-0
|-
| colspan=9 | Legend:

See also 
List of K-1 events
List of male kickboxers

References

External links
Fans of K-1 - Leroy Kaestner profile

Dutch male kickboxers
Welterweight kickboxers
People from Zandvoort
Living people
1988 births
Sportspeople from North Holland